Cutchogue was a station stop along the Greenport Branch of the Long Island Rail Road. It was located on Depot Lane in Cutchogue, New York, a street that was named for the station.

History 
Cutchogue station first appeared on an issued timetable on July 29, 1844, Some sort of structure that was described as new is mentioned in a notice of March 1870. In August 1875 a depot building was put up. A newer and larger station building was erected in 1887.  The station building was closed in 1958 and it was discontinued as a station stop around June 1962.

References

External links
Photo of Cutchogue from 1953 - Ron Ziel collection

Former Long Island Rail Road stations in Suffolk County, New York
Railway stations in the United States opened in 1844
Railway stations closed in 1962
Southold, New York
1844 establishments in New York (state)
1962 disestablishments in New York (state)